This is a list consisting of the deadliest floods worldwide with a minimum of 60 deaths.

List

Floods by year
Only floods having caused 10 fatalities or more in 21st-century are listed.

2023

2022

2021

2020

2019

2018

2017

2016

2015

2014

2013

2012

2011

2010

2009

2008

2007

2006

2005

2004

2003

2002

2001

2000

Notes 
1.Some reports list as many as 12,000 dead.

See also 
 List of floods
 List of flash floods
 List of natural disasters by death toll

References

External links 
Global Active Archive of Large Flood Events, Dartmouth Flood Observatory

Deadliest
Floods